Shikarpur or Shakkarpur or Sikarpur may refer to the following places:

India 
Shikarpur, Bihar (Vidhan Sabha constituency)
Shikarpur, Gujarat, a village and Harappan archeological site in Kutch district of Gujarat
Shikarpur, Shimoga, a town in Karnataka
Shikarpur, Sultanpur Lodhi, a village in Kapurthala district of Punjab
Shikarpur, Bulandshahr, a city and municipal board in Uttar Pradesh
Shikarpur (Assembly constituency), an assembly constituency in Uttar Pradesh
Shikarpur, Muzaffarnagar, a town in Uttar Pradesh
Shikarpur, Jaunpur, a village in Uttar Pradesh
Shikarpur, Sonepur, a village in Uttar Pradesh
Shikarpur, Najafgarh, a village in Delhi
Shikarpur village, Saran district, a village in Bihar
Sikarpur, Cooch Behar, a village in West Bengal

Pakistan 
Shikarpur, Sindh, a city in Sindh Province
Shikarpur District, the district
Shikarpur railway station